Woodsdale is a ghost town in Stevens County, Kansas, United States.  It was involved in a county seat war with Hugoton during the 19th century.

History
Woodsdale was laid out in 1886 near the geographical center of the county, with the hope of locating the county seat there.

Samuel Newitt Wood and I. C. Price developed the town and it was named after the former. Its post office was established November 11, 1886, and the town incorporated April 11. 1887. Following the bloody county seat contest in which the governor had to send in two National Guard companies, and which Woodsdale lost to Hugoton, Woodsdale declined. The post office closed March 31, 1915, and there are now no traces of the town remaining. It was located two miles east of Hugoton and six miles north at the intersections of sections 11, 12, 13, & 14.

Notable person
 Mabel Walker Willebrandt was born in Woodsdale.

See also
 Hay Meadow Massacre
 Wild Horse Lake (Oklahoma)

References

Further reading

Butler, Ken. Kansas Blood Spilled Into Oklahoma. Blue Skyways (retrieved October 27, 2006)
Mason, Henry F. "County Seat Controversies in Southwestern Kansas" The Kansas Historical Quarterly 2:1 (February 1933) 45–65. (retrieved from The Kansas Collection October 27, 2006)

External links
 Stevens County Maps: Current, Historic, KDOT

Populated places in Stevens County, Kansas
Ghost towns in Kansas